Eldersley is a hamlet in the Canadian province of Saskatchewan.

Demographics 

References 

Designated places in Saskatchewan
Hamlets in Saskatchewan
Tisdale No. 427, Saskatchewan